WAUH (102.3 FM) is a radio station broadcasting a classic hits format. Licensed to Wautoma, Wisconsin, United States.  The station is currently owned by Hometown Broadcasting, LLC.
The transmitter is located west of Redgranite.

WAUH programming was simulcast on WISS on 1100 kHz and FM translator W252DR on 98.3 MHz until they were acquired by Civic Media LLC in October 2022.

History
Since 2001 WAUH "The Bug" has been locally owned and operated by Hometown Broadcasting. WAUH was built by the local Boyson family in Wautoma early in the year 2000 under low power until roughly mid 2001 when they went to 5,300 watts.

References

External links

AUH
Classic hits radio stations in the United States
Radio stations established in 2002
2002 establishments in Wisconsin